Ciao Brother is a 2016 Italian film directed by Nicola Barnaba.

Plot
The film concerns about Angelo, who is a swindler who escapes to Los Angeles.

Cast
Fabrizio Nardi: Angelo
Nico Di Renzo: George
Benedicta Boccoli: Patricia
Francesca Della Ragione: Alyssa
Clayton Norcross: Mr. Cullinhan
Mietta: Claire
Emanuela Aurizi: Manila
Ami Veevers Chorlton: Miss Brandy
Massimo Ceccherini: Tassista
Roberto Ciufoli: Detective privato
David Zed: Avvocato Welles

External links

2016 films
2016 drama films
2010s Italian-language films
Films set in 2016
Films set in Italy
Italian drama films
2010s Italian films